Pengal Neram is a Tamil Entertainment show that premiered on 21 August 2012 and airs Monday through Friday on Raj TV. This show showcases the talents of women in various fields including cookery, art, craft, household chores.

External links
Raj TV Official Site 

Raj TV television series